Edgewood Independent School District is a public school district based in Edgewood, Texas, United States.

In 2009, the school district was rated "academically acceptable" by the Texas Education Agency.

School information
Colors: Purple, Gold and White
Mascot: The Bulldog
Yearbook title: The Kennel
Football stadium: I. T. James Memorial Stadium

Campus
There are four schools in Edgewood ISD, all located on one campus at 804 East Pine Street in Edgewood.

Edgewood High School (grades 9-12)
Edgewood Middle School (grades 6-8)
Edgewood Intermediate School (grades 3-5)
Edgewood Elementary School (grades PK-2)

Notable alumni 
Scott Tyner - NFL punter, Atlanta Falcons 1994
Cameron McCasland - Regional Emmy nominated film maker
Rachel Barr - All American shot put and track and field star; class of 1984

References

External links

School districts in Van Zandt County, Texas